Veronika Jenet is an Australian film editor, best known for The Piano, Rabbit-Proof Fence and Lore. Jenet is a member of the Australian Screen Editors Guild.

She was nominated at the 66th Academy Awards in the category of Best Film Editing for the film The Piano.

Filmography

References

External links

Living people
Australian film editors
Year of birth missing (living people)
Place of birth missing (living people)
Australian women film editors